List of notable individuals who were born or lived in Maribor:

 Tomaž Barada, taekwondo athlete
Walter Wolf, tycoon, businessman person
 Sani Bečirovič, basketball player
 Bernhard von Spanheim, founder of the city
 Fredi Bobic, German-Slovene association football player
 Urška Bračko, 2014 Miss Universe Slovenia
 Brigita Brezovac, IFBB professional bodybuilder
 Aleš Čeh, football player
 Mladen Dolar, philosopher
 Filip Flisar, ski cross champion
 Vekoslav Grmič, Roman Catholic bishop and theologian
 Herta Haas, Yugoslav Partisan and second wife of Josip Broz Tito
 Polona Hercog, tennis player
 Israel Isserlin, Medieval rabbi
 Jure Ivanušič, actor and musician
 Archduke Johann of Austria, Habsburg nobleman and philanthropist
 Drago Jančar, author
 Mima Jaušovec, female tennis player
 Kevin Kampl, football player
 Janko Kastelic, conductor and music director
 Matjaž Kek, association football player and manager
 Maja Keuc, singer who represented Slovenia in the Eurovision Song Contest 2011
 Aleksander Knavs, football player
 Edvard Kocbek, poet, essayist, and politician
 Jana Kolarič (born 1954), author and translator.
 Katja Koren, alpine skier
 Anton Korošec, politician
 Luka Krajnc, football player
 Bratko Kreft, author
 Rene Krhin, football player
 Marko Letonja, conductor
 Rudolf Maister, military leader
 Janez Menart, poet and translator
 Jan Muršak, second ever Slovenian NHL hockey player
 Tomaž Pandur, stage director
 Tone Partljič, playwright, screenwriter, politician
 Matjaž Perc, physicist
 Žarko Petan, writer, essayist, theatre and film director
 Janko Pleterski, historian
 Herman Potočnik, rocket engineer and pioneer of astronautics
 Zoran Predin, singer
 Ladislaus von Rabcewicz, Austrian civil engineer
 Anton Martin Slomšek, Roman Catholic bishop, author, poet, and advocate of Slovene culture
 Ilka Štuhec, alpine skiing champion
 Leon Štukelj, Olympic champion
 Luka Šulić, cellist, member of the 2Cellos duo
 Marcos Tavares, football player
 Wilhelm von Tegetthoff, Austrian admiral
 Jurij Toplak, constitutional scholar, election law expert
 Ludvik Toplak, lawyer, university rector, ambassador
 Anton Trstenjak, theologian, psychologist, essayist
 Danilo Türk, former president of Slovenia
 Prežihov Voranc, writer and political activist
 Sasha Vujačić, basketball player
 Zlatko Zahovič, association football player

 
Maribor